The Dubuque Rail Bridge carries a single rail line across the Mississippi River between Dubuque, Iowa, and East Dubuque, Illinois, near river mile 580. It is currently operated by Canadian National Railway as a result of their 1999 purchase of Illinois Central Railroad.

History

The original swing bridge was constructed by Andrew Carnegie and operated by the Dunleith & Dubuque Bridge Company. Going into service in December 1868, it primarily was used by the Illinois Central Railroad. It was rebuilt in the 1890s.

The current Dubuque Rail Bridge has 5 spans and a swing-span. It has been altered somewhat over the years, with last rehabilitation in 2012, but so far has retained the fixed center pier.

Operation

Because of a  bluff very close to the Mississippi riverbank on the Illinois side, about 1/2 mile south of the bridge the approaching railroad track diverges away from the main tracks (and the river) to enter a 1/4-mile tunnel, which then curves about 90-degrees so the bridge track can cross the continuing tracks running adjacent to the river.

See also
List of crossings of the Upper Mississippi River

References

External links
USACE.mil Dubuque Rail Bridge clearances

Bridges over the Mississippi River
Railroad bridges in Iowa
Railroad bridges in Illinois
Bridges completed in 1868
Buildings and structures in Dubuque, Iowa
Transportation buildings and structures in Jo Daviess County, Illinois
Canadian National Railway bridges in the United States
Illinois Central Railroad
Transportation in Dubuque, Iowa
Bridges in Dubuque County, Iowa
1868 establishments in Iowa
1868 establishments in Illinois
Interstate railroad bridges in the United States